Highway 95 (AR 95, Ark. 95, and Hwy. 95) is a designation for a north–south state highway in north central Arkansas. The route runs  runs north from US Highway 64 and Highway 113 in Morrilton north to Highway 330.

Route description

Highway 95 begins in the Arkansas River Valley at US 64 and Highway 113 in Morrilton and runs north past the historic Morrilton Post Office, listed on National Register of Historic Places (NRHP). The route runs north through a residential area before intersections with Highway 132 and Highway 95 Spur (AR 95S). North of these junctions, the highway crosses Interstate 40 (I-40) at a full interchange before becoming a rural route and passing through unincorporated areas.

In central Conway County, the highway serves as the eastern terminus of Highway 213 before beginning a concurrency with Highway 124 at Wonderview. The overlapping routes serve as the northern terminus for Highway 287 before Highway 124 departs the route at Mt. Zion. The route runs north to the edge of the Ozark National Forest before turning northeast and entering Van Buren County.

The highway passes through Beverage Town, Scotland and Walnut Grove before entering Clinton. In the city, Highway 95 begins an overlap with U.S. Route 65B (US 65B) heading south. The concurrent routes pass near the Van Buren County Courthouse and Walter Patterson Filling Station, both NRHP-listed properties. US 65B terminates at the parent route, and US 65/Highway 95 run south until Highway 95 splits from US 65 near the Ozark Health Medical Center. The route runs southeast to terminate at Highway 330 near Greers Ferry Lake.

Major intersections

Morrilton spur

Highway 95 Spur (AR 95S, Ark. 95S and Hwy. 95S) is a spur route in Morrilton. It is a short city street leading from the parent route to the Bosch (formerly Telex Communications) factory.

Major intersections

See also

 List of state highways in Arkansas

References

External links

095
Transportation in Conway County, Arkansas
Transportation in Van Buren County, Arkansas